Louis Humphreys (September 21, 1816 – May 9, 1880) was a doctor, medical inspector for the Union Army during the American Civil War, and two-term mayor of South Bend, Indiana (1868 - 1872). He was born in Ohio. Abraham Lincoln appointed him as one of eight medical inspectors for the United States Army.

Humphreys was born in Springfield, Ohio. His older brother Harvey was also a doctor. Humphreys came to South Bend in 1844. He attended Indiana Medical College.

He was the second mayor of South Bend. He was a Republican.

Humphreys' father was a native of Ireland who immigrated to the U.S. in his early 20s.

Humphreys was involved in organizing South Bend's original public library.

See also
List of mayors of South Bend, Indiana

References

1816 births
1880 deaths
Politicians from Springfield, Ohio
Mayors of South Bend, Indiana
19th-century American physicians
American military doctors
Union Army personnel
Indiana Republicans